This is a list of notable mayonnaises and mayonnaise-based sauces. Mayonnaise is a thick cold sauce or dressing and also forms the base for many other sauces. It is an emulsion of oil, egg yolk, and an acid, either vinegar or lemon juice;

Mayonnaises

Brands

 
 
 
 
 
  - Polish mayonnaise from Kielce

Mayonnaise-based sauces

Mayonnaise is used as a foundation for several sauces, including some found in French cuisine.
  made from a mix of ketchup and mayonnaise

See also

 Boiled dressing
 Fritessaus
 List of condiments
 List of sauces
 Miracle Whip – developed in 1933 as a less expensive alternative to mayonnaise

References

 
Condiments
Lists of foods